The International Journal of Sociology and Social Policy is a peer-reviewed academic journal covering research in sociology and on social policy. The journal was established in 1981 and is published by Emerald Group Publishing. The editor-in-chief is Colin C. Williams (University of Sheffield).

Abstracting and indexing 
The journal is abstracted and indexed in:
 ABI/INFORM
 Educational Research Abstracts
 International Bibliography of the Social Sciences
 ProQuest
 Sociological Abstracts
 TOC Premier

External links 
 

Sociology journals
English-language journals
Publications established in 1981
Bimonthly journals
Emerald Group Publishing academic journals